Kettle of fish can refer to:

 Kettle of Fish, a 1998 compilation album by Derek William Dick
 Kettle of Fish (bar), a bar in New York City
 Kettle of Fish (film), a 2006 film